The Tale of the Lychee Mirror is a play written by an unknown author in the Ming dynasty. 
Tân Saⁿ and Gō͘-niû is a popular Taiwanese opera based on the script.

History
The play was written in a mixture of the Southern Min dialects of Quanzhou and Chaozhou (Teochew), and is one of the earliest sources on those dialects.  The oldest extant manuscripts date from 1566 and 1581.

This story is widely spread in Minnan-speaking areas, mainly the south part of Fujian, Chaozhou (a city in eastern Guangdong), Southeast Asia and Taiwan. Tân Saⁿ Gō͘-niû is one of the top four Taiwanese operas.

Story
Tân Saⁿ (Tan) is a scholar who is native to Quanzhou in southern Fujian province. When he sent his brother- and sister-in-law to Guangnan, he stopped in Chaozhou. During the Lantern Festival, Tan met N̂g Gō͘-niû (Ng) by chance and they fell in love with one another. Lim, a local rich man's son, also saw Ng in the lantern show, and he was shocked by Ng's beauty. So Lim asked for a blind date and sent a lot of bride-price to Ng's house, because he wanted to marry Ng. Ng's father was greedy so he agreed to Lim's proposal. Ng did not want to obey her father's decision but she was obligated to, so she fell into deep sorrow.

In June, Ng went to the embroidered house accompanied by her maidservant, Ang. At that time, Tan returned to Chaozhou seeking Ng. They recognized one another in the long distance and were filled with all kinds of emotions. Ng threw her handkerchief with lychee to Tan to show her own feeling. Tan was very excited and then he came up with an idea to go to Ng's house to see her again.

Several days later, Tan, disguised as a person, broke the treasure mirror on purpose. So he could sell himself to Ng's family as a servant to compensate the mirror. Ng guessed Tan's motive so she was very happy but worried. She could not deny the marriage with Lim and stay with Tan forever.

A year later, Tan still could not know what Ng's mind exactly. He was so disappointed that he decided to return to Quanzhou. Ang asked the reasons then she sent a letter written by Tan to Ng. After reading his letter, Ng was very moved and met Tan alone. They loved each other deeply and decided to stay with each other no matter how hard the difficulties were. Lim could not wait to marry Ng, so he asked Ng to marry him within three days. Tan and Ng had no choice but to escape from Chaozhou to Quanzhou.

References

Li Zhuo Jun (李卓吾; Ming Dynasty). Li Jing Zhuan (荔鏡傳)

External links

Digital scan, 重刊五色潮泉插科增入詩詞北曲勾欄荔鏡記戲曲全集 (1566), vol. 1. Oxford, Bodleian Library Sinica 34/1
Digital scan, 重刊五色潮泉插科增入詩詞北曲勾欄荔鏡記戲曲全集 (1566), vol. 2. Oxford, Bodleian Library Sinica 34/2
Digital scan, 重刊五色潮泉插科增入詩詞北曲勾欄荔鏡記 (1566). Peking University Library, via Internet Archive
Digital scan, 新刻增補全像鄉談荔枝記 (1581) Austrian National Library
Collated edition, with notes and recording of recitation in Taiwanese Southern Min pronunciation, from Taiwan Ministry of Culture

Chinese operas
Opera in Taiwan
Southern Min-language works